Boyz is a free, London-based magazine targeted at gay men and the LGBT community. It is distributed mainly through gay bars, pubs, clubs shops and saunas in the United Kingdom. In July 2019 Boyz moved from a weekly to a monthly frequency of publication with its August edition, its first monthly issue. Boyz focuses on news, features and photospreads about the gay scene.

History

Boyz was founded by David Bridle and Kelvin Sollis in 1991. It is based in London.

The first "dummy" edition of Boyz magazine was distributed by Kelvin Sollis, David Bridle and friends at Gay Pride in June 1991. The first full edition of Boyz was published on Thursday 4 July 1991 and distributed to gay venues in London. David Bridle was its first editor and continues to be its managing editor. Previous editors have included Simon Gage (1993 - 1998), David Hudson (1998 - 2006) and Stuart Brumfitt (2007 - 2011). More recently Luke Till edited the title. The current long term senior writer is Dave Cross.

Boyz format at launch was tabloid-size newsprint with some pages in colour, published weekly. Content included naked pin ups, contact ads, an Agony Uncle and articles about coming out, relationships and gay sex - as well as editorial coverage of the gay scene. The printing format changed to an A4 size full colour magazine in 2001.

In 2007, Boyz was re-designed and relaunched. Most of the sexually explicit content was removed and the magazine increased news and social scene coverage. Adverts for male escorts and erotic phonelines were dropped in 2008.

In July 2019 Boyz switched to become a free monthly publication.

In November 2020, Boyz attracted criticism after the magazine's Twitter account repeatedly retweeted the controversial advocacy group LGB Alliance, which has been condemned by high profile members of the British LGBT community including Matt Lucas as transphobic. Several club events and Pride in London subsequently ended their support for the magazine. The magazine subsequently apologised, but in January 2021, there was further criticism after the editor wrote a comment piece for Spiked saying that the Terrence Higgins Trust's decision to withdraw advertising from the magazine over the controversy was a 'witch-hunt'.

References

External links

1991 establishments in the United Kingdom
Free magazines
Gay men's magazines published in the United Kingdom
Magazines established in 1991
Magazines published in London
Monthly magazines published in the United Kingdom
Weekly magazines published in the United Kingdom